Hector Tiberghien (19 February 1888 in Wattrelos – 17 August 1951 in Neuilly-sur-Seine) was a Belgian cyclist.

He won Paris–Tours in 1919 and participated in eight Tours de France.

Major results
1919
Paris–Tours

1923
3rd Paris–Tours
4th Tour de France

Results in the Tour de France
1912: 7th
1914: 18th
1919: DNF
1920: DNF
1921: 5th
1922: 6th
1923: 4th
1924: 10th

References

1888 births
1951 deaths
Belgian male cyclists
People from Wattrelos
Cyclists from Hauts-de-France
Sportspeople from Nord (French department)